Eusiridae is a family of amphipods. It contains the following genera:

Cleonardo Stebbing, 1888
Eusirella Chevreux, 1908
Eusirogenes Stebbing, 1904
Eusiropsis Stebbing, 1897
Eusirus Krøyer, 1845
Harcledo J. L. Barnard, 1964
Laothoe Fabricius, 1807
Meteusiroides Pirlot, 1934
Pareusirogenes Birstein & M. Vinogradov, 1955
Rhachotropis S. I. Smith, 1883
Triquetramana Hendrycks & Conlan, 2003

References

Gammaridea
Taxa named by Thomas Roscoe Rede Stebbing
Crustacean families